SCEA or Scea may refer to:

 Scea, a genus of moths
 SCEA v. Hotz, a lawsuit involving Sony
 Single choice early action, a type of early admission process offered by some U.S. institutions
 Sony Interactive Entertainment America, formerly known as Sony Computer Entertainment America
 South Carolina Education Association
 Sun Certified Enterprise Architect, a professional certification
 Swan Christian Education Association, in Perth, Australia
 El Amarillo Airport (ICAO: SCEA), Chaitén, Los Lagos Region, Chile